Sonidosaurus (meaning "Sonid lizard", after Sonid, the large geographical area that includes the type locality ) is a genus of sauropod dinosaur from the Late Cretaceous. It was a titanosaur which lived in what is now Inner Mongolia. The type species, Sonidosaurus saihangaobiensis, was described by Xu, Zhang, Tan, Zhao, and Tan in 2006.  It was a small titanosaur, about 9 meters (30 ft) long. It was first discovered in the Iren Dabasu Formation in 2001 in a quarry which would later yield the remains of Gigantoraptor starting in 2005.

Classification 
In a 2017 review of Asian titanosaurs, Sonidosaurus was considered a lithostrotian titanosaur, with possible saltasaurid affinities. In particular, it shared with saltasaurids and the Bor Guve titanosaur a posterior centrodiapophyseal lamina on its dorsal vertebrae.

References

External links
 Sonidosaurus at Dinodata.de (in German)

Late Cretaceous dinosaurs of Asia
Lithostrotians
Fossil taxa described in 2006
Taxa named by Xu Xing